The Ministry of Other Backward Bahujan Welfare is a Ministry of the Government of Maharashtra.

The Ministry is headed by a cabinet level Minister is Atul Save.

Head office

List of Cabinet Ministers

List of Ministers of State

List of Principal Secretaries

References

Government ministries of Maharashtra